Ichera may refer to:

Ichera, a river of the Lena basin, Russia
Ichera, Bulgaria, a village in Sliven Municipality, Bulgaria 
Ichera (rural locality), a settlement in Kirensky District, Irkutsk Oblast, Russian Far East
Ichera Peak, a mountain in Antarctica